Minuscule 329 (in the Gregory-Aland numbering), A219 (Soden), is a Greek minuscule manuscript of the New Testament, on parchment. Palaeographically it has been assigned to the 12th century.

Description 

The codex contains the text of the four Gospels on 321 parchment leaves with some lacunae. The text is written in one column per page, biblical text in 25 lines per page, text of commentary in 50 lines per page.

Matthew 25:36-28:20 was added by a later hand, without a commentary. Mark 14:11-20 has not a commentary.

Text 

The Greek text of the codex is a representative of the Byzantine text-type. Aland placed it in Category V.
It was not examined by the Claremont Profile Method.

History 

The manuscript was described by Bernard de Montfaucon. It was added to the list of New Testament manuscripts by Scholz (1794-1852). 
It was examined and described by Paulin Martin. C. R. Gregory saw it in 1885.

The manuscript is currently housed at the Bibliothèque nationale de France (Coislin, Gr. 19) at Paris.

See also 

 List of New Testament minuscules
 Biblical manuscript
 Textual criticism

References

Further reading 

 Bernard de Montfaucon, Bibliotheca Coisliniana (Paris, 1715), B. 62f.

Greek New Testament minuscules
12th-century biblical manuscripts
Fonds Coislin